The mohawk (also referred to as a Mohican) is a hairstyle in which, in the most common variety, both sides of the head are shaven, leaving a strip of noticeably longer hair in the center. Mohawk hairstyles have existed for thousands of years. As of the 21st century, they are most commonly associated with non-conformity.

The mohawk is also sometimes referred to as an iro in reference to the Iroquois (who include the Mohawk people), from whom the hairstyle is supposedly derived – though historically the hair was plucked out rather than shaved. Additionally, hairstyles bearing these names more closely resemble those worn by the Pawnee, rather than the Mohawk, Mohicans, Mohegan, or other groups whose names are phonetically similar.

Name 
While the mohawk hairstyle takes its name from the people of the Mohawk nation, an indigenous people of North America who originally inhabited the Mohawk Valley in upstate New York, the association comes from Hollywood and more specifically from the popular 1939 film Drums Along the Mohawk starring Henry Fonda.

The Mohawk and the rest of the Iroquois confederacy (Seneca, Cayuga, Onondaga, Tuscarora, and Oneida) in fact wore a square of hair on the back of the crown of the head. The Mohawk did not shave their heads when creating this square of hair but rather pulled the hair out, small tufts at a time. The following is a first-hand account of James Smith, who was captured during the French and Indian War and adopted into the Mohawk tribe:

Therefore, a true hairstyle of the Mohawks was one of plucked-out hair, leaving a three-inch square of hair on the back crown of the head with three short braids of hair decorated. The three braids of a True Mohawk hairstyle are represented today on traditional headdresses of the Mohawk known as a Gustoweh. Mohawk Gustowehs have three upright eagle feathers that represent the three braids of long ago. When not decorated, the very short braids were allowed to hang loose as seen in Good Peter's image in the referenced article.

Historical use 
The hairstyle has been in existence in many parts of the world for millennia. For instance, the Clonycavan Man, a 2000-year-old male bog body discovered near Dublin in 2003, was found to be wearing a mohawk styled with plant oil and pine resin. Herodotus stated that the Macai, a northern Libyan tribe, "shave their hair so as to leave tufts, letting the middle of their hair grow long, but round this on all sides shaving it close to the skin."

Among the Pawnee people, who historically lived in present-day Nebraska and in northern Kansas, a "mohawk" hairstyle was common.

When going to war, 16th-century Ukrainian Cossacks would shave their heads, leaving a long central strip. This haircut was known as an oseledets or chupryna and was often braided or tied in a topknot.

During World War II, many American GIs, notably paratroopers from the 17th Airborne Division wore mohawks to intimidate their enemies. It was also occasionally worn by American troops during the Vietnam War. In the early 1950s, mohawks were worn by some jazz musicians like Sonny Rollins.

Varieties 
Although a mohawk is most widely defined as a narrow, central strip of upright hair running from the forehead to the nape, with the sides of the head bald, the term can be applied more loosely to various similar hairstyles, many of which have informal names.

Rather than the strip of longer hair in the center of the scalp, a reverse mohawk, also known as a nohawk or hawkmo, features a shaved strip from the forehead to the nape of the neck leaving hair on either side of the line. Pioneering examples were sported by professional wrestler Road Warrior Hawk, and English rock singer Peter Gabriel whilst on tour with progressive rock band Genesis in 1973.

A fauxhawk copies the style of a mohawk, but without shaving the sides of the head and not extending past the peak of the cranium. The fauxhawk is typically worn with a small but noticeable spike in the middle, though usually considerably shorter than many traditional mohawks. The style re-emerged in the 2000s, with some of the popularly known wearers being Travis vocalist Fran Healy, David Beckham, Elijah Wood, and Jónsi. The fauxhawk is also known as the "Hoxton fin" after the Hoxton district of London, where it was fashionable in the 1990s.
A fauxhawk where the hair down the center of the head is longer than the hair on the sides is a euro-hawk. Sometimes the top of the hair is long enough to cover up the shorter sides when combed down. Some of the more popular sports figures and fashion models can be found wearing euro-hawks in various lengths, textures, and colors. The mohawk has been a style mostly seen on punk rockers and the like, but fauxhawks and euro-hawks have transcended to all hair types. The ponyhawk or pony hawk is a type of euro-hawk created by a row of ponytails going down the middle of the head.  This look was worn by contestant Sanjaya Malakar on an episode of the television series American Idol.

See also 
List of hairstyles
Roach (headdress)
Queue

References

External links 

1980s fashion
1990s fashion
2000s fashion
2010s fashion
Gothic fashion
Hairstyles
Iroquois culture
Native American culture
Pawnee
Punk fashion